A Merry Mirthworm Christmas is an animated television special, produced by Perennial Pictures. It premiered on the Showtime Cable Network on December 14, 1984. Mirthworms tend to use proper nouns that play on the word "worm". The characters live in the town of Wormingham, the main character is named Burt Worm, and the antagonist is named Wormaline Wiggler.

The show was followed by two additional Mirthworm specials, A Mirthworm Masquerade (1987) and Mirthworms on Stage (1989).

A Merry Mirthworm Christmas
Burt Worm has just moved into the town of Wormingham.  Excited for the Christmas season he is invited by his neighbor, Crystal Crawler, to assist in decorating the Town Hall.  Due to his clumsiness, chaos is caused in the Town Hall, and holiday decorations are knocked over and broken. Burt is then asked by chairworm Wormaline Wiggler to leave immediately, which he does.

Burt proceeds to sing a song about how he is so lonely, and just wanted to make some friends.  He writes a note, but just before he leaves, Crystal appears at his door telling him to come to the party. Burt refuses because what he did this morning and tells Crystal to head to the party without him. Crystal then leaves to the party to find out who asked Burt to not come, but after Crystal leaves, Burt leaves the house. At the party, Crystal tells everyone about how hard he tried to fit in, and tells that Christmas is for everyone and she says that Burt deserves another chance. The Mayor shows up shortly after, and is unhappy with Wormaline for asking Burt to leave, stating that Christmas is for everyone, the mayor threatens to remove Wormaline from her position as chairworm. The Mirthworms then rush to Burt's house only to realize that Burt has run away. Refusing to not give up, Wilbur Diggs starts up search parties to find Burt.

The search proceeds, but the weather gets so bad that the Mirthworms have no choice but to return to Wormingham.  Upon arrival at Town Hall many of the Mirthworms express how sad they are that Burt has left, stating that they really liked him. Crystal is incredibly sad, because she said that Burt is her friend and her friend was the best thing he could be. As the Mirthworms are moping about, Burt wakes up near the tree asking why they are so sad, they state that it is because they fear the worst for Burt (not realizing that it was he who asked them).  When they realize that Burt is there, they are surprised and happy.  Burt explains that it got so cold that he decided to come back to the Town Hall and fell asleep.

Under pressure from the mayor Wormaline apologizes to Burt for asking him to leave. Despite all of this, the Mayor still removes her from chairworm position, and instead gives her a different Christmas gift: giving Burt a second chance. Then Crystal announces how Burt can contribute to the Christmas celebration, he has an excellent singing voice. Burt proceeds to sing "Deck the Halls", and "I Wish You a Merry Christmas" (a modified version of "We Wish You a Merry Christmas").

A Mirthworm Masquerade
A Mirthworm Masquerade first aired on April 11, 1987.

The Mirthworms of Wormingham are all excited about the annual Masquerade Ball, and Bert is planning to ask Crystal to be his date. But Wormaline Wiggler forces Bert to dress as Prince Pringle and accompany her to the ball when the real prince fails to show up, forcing Bert to break Crystal's heart.

At the ball, Bert causes trouble, then leaves. The real Prince Pringle then arrives and puts on Bert's discarded mask, causing Wormaline to mistake him for Bert and treat him in her usual unpleasant matter. Meanwhile, Bert finds Crystal and hurries to get her to the ball. Upon arriving, Crystal is named Queen of the ball. Wormaline's anger at this changes to horror when Prince Pringle reveals himself, and she realizes just who she had been mistreating. Crystal kisses Bert on the cheek.

Mirthworms on Stage
Mirthworms on Stage first aired on July 20, 1989

The Mirthworms take center stage at the Wormingham Bowl as they present "Sleeping Beauty." Wormaline Wiggler tries to wrangle the lead but Crystal Crawler wins the prize. Crystal is reluctant to do so, as she suffers from stage fright, but Bert convinces her. Wormaline attempts to steal the show, but her sneaky shenanigans bring down the house instead.

Cast
The voice cast included:

 Jerry Reynolds: Bert Worm, Teddy Toddlers, Wilbur Diggs, Baggs, Homer, Prince Pringle, Armbruster
 Rachel Rutledge: Crystal Crawler, Gertie
 Miki Mathioudakis: Wormaline Wiggler
 Peggy Nicholson: Eulalia Inch, Agnes, Dribble
 Russ Harris: Mayor Filmore Q. Pettiworm, Eudora Vanderworm
 Michael N. Ruggiero: Brooks
 Adam Dykstra: Chester, Arnold

Availability

All three cartoons have been individually released on VHS in America by Family Home Entertainment. A Merry Mirthworm Christmas and A Mirthworm Masquerade were released in the UK on VHS by Castle Vision.

In 2006, both A Merry Mirthworm Christmas and A Mirthworm Masquerade were released on DVD in Australia by MRA Entertainment.

A Merry Mirthworm Christmas was featured on a promotional Christmas DVD released by the Daily Mail, accompanied with the cartoon, The Glo Friends Save Christmas. In 2007, all three films were released for digital download in America by GoDigital, as of August 2018 all three films have now been made available in the UK on digital through Amazon Instant, with Mirthworms on Stage now being made available to UK viewing audiences following no VHS release, but its only UK December 26th 1989 transmission on BBC1.

References

External links
 

Christmas television specials
1980s animated television specials
1980s American television specials
Showtime (TV network) original programming
1984 television specials
Fictional worms